Jan Hendrik Olivier was a Boer general during the Second Boer War who was notable for being the main Boer commander at the Battle of Stormberg.

Early life
His parents lived in the Burgersdorp area and later moved to Zastron. At the age of 15, he joined the Orange Free State border police. In 1865 he became a Field Cornet and fought in the Seqiti War. He was rewarded with the farm Olifantsbeen where he becomes prosperous. He became a member of the House of Assembly in 1883 for the Caledon River Division.

Second Boer War
He was in command of the Rouxville and Thaba Nchu commandos, and moved with his mother through the Colesberg, Barkly East and Dordrecht areas. He was in command of the Boer forces during the Battle of Stormberg in December 1899. Later he worked with General De Wet in the eastern Free State and Brandwater area. After an argument with De Wet, he decided to join the Transvaal Army. On the way there, he was captured on July 3, 1900, and was exiled to Ceylon with three of his sons as prisoners of war.

Post-War Life
He was released from exile in 1902 and became a member of the Legislative Assembly for the Orange River Colony as well as a horse breeder before withdrawing from public life in 1910. He went to retire with his daughter at Rustenburg. He died during a visit to Volksrust and was buried there with his military honors.

References

Bibliography
 The Hall Handbook of the Anglo Boer War. Darrell Hall. 1999. 
 The War Reporter. J.E.H. Grobler. Jonathan Ball Publishers. 2004. 

1854 births
1930 deaths
People from Burgersdorp
Afrikaner people
Orange Free State generals
South African military personnel
Orange Free State military personnel of the Second Boer War
South African Republic military personnel of the Second Boer War
Boer generals